Liu Fang (Chinese: 柳芳, Hanyu pinyin: Liǔ Fāng; born February 1962) is a Chinese attorney who was the twelfth Secretary General of the International Civil Aviation Organization (ICAO), a position she has held from 2015 until 2021 when Juan Carlos Salazar was appointed the new Secretary General. She was the first woman to hold this position.

Prior to joining ICAO, Liu served the General Administration of Civil Aviation of China (CAAC), where over the course of twenty years she eventually became responsible for China's international air transport policy and regulations, bilateral and multilateral relations with international and regional organizations including ICAO, the World Trade Organization, the Asia-Pacific Economic Cooperation (APEC), the European Union, and the Association of Southeast Asian Nations (ASEAN).

During her career with the CAAC, Liu was elected chair of the Aviation Group of the Asia-Pacific Economic Cooperation (APEC) and was nominated by China to sit on the Air Transport Regulation Panel in ICAO. She also served as an expert on mediation and dispute resolution. She was chief negotiator for the Chinese government for bilateral and multilateral air transport agreements with foreign countries.

Criticism 
In 2016, despite Taiwan being a recognized international air traffic hub, Taiwan was not permitted to attend the September 27th ICAO meeting.

In the midst of the COVID-19 pandemic, the ICAO came under fire for denying Taiwan access to participation in crisis coordination efforts and subsequently attempting to silence such criticism on Twitter. In some cases, the agency offered to unblock users who were willing to publicly reverse their comments, provoking further suspicion about the motives of the agency under Liu's leadership.

References 

Living people
Chinese women lawyers
International Civil Aviation Organization people
Chinese officials of the United Nations
Wuhan University alumni
Leiden University alumni
1962 births